Lake Macquarie is an electoral district of the Legislative Assembly in Greater Newcastle, Hunter Region of the Australian state of New South Wales. It is represented by the independent Greg Piper.

Lake Macquarie is entirely located in the City of Lake Macquarie, Greater Newcastle and includes suburbs as far north as Killingworth, Boolaroo and Cardiff and as far east as Cardiff South. Suburbs further north are in Cessnock and Wallsend and suburbs further east are in Charlestown and Swansea.

Members for Lake Macquarie

Election results

References

Lake Macquarie
City of Lake Macquarie
1950 establishments in Australia
Lake Macquarie